The tomb of Jesus refers to any place where it is believed that Jesus was entombed or interred.

Church of the Holy Sepulchre 

The Church of the Holy Sepulchre is a church in the Christian Quarter of the Old City of Jerusalem. It contains, according to traditions dating back to the fourth century, the two holiest sites in Christianity: the site where Jesus was crucified, at a place known as Calvary or Golgotha, and Jesus's empty tomb, where He is believed by Christians to have been buried and resurrected.

The marble covering protecting the original limestone slab upon which Jesus was thought to have been laid by Joseph of Arimathea had been temporarily removed for restoration and cleaning on October 26, 2016, as a result revealing the original slab for the first time since 1555.

In the Apocrypha 
Within the apocryphal text known as the Gospel of Peter, the tomb of Jesus is called "Joseph's garden".

Alternative locations

The Garden Tomb

The Garden Tomb is a rock-cut tomb in Jerusalem, which was unearthed in 1867 and is considered by some Protestants to be the tomb of Jesus. The tomb has been dated by Israeli archaeologist Gabriel Barkay to the 8th–7th centuries BC.

Talpiot Tomb
The Talpiot Tomb (or Talpiyot Tomb) is a rock-cut tomb discovered in 1980 in the East Talpiot neighborhood, five kilometers (three miles) south of the Old City in East Jerusalem. It contained ten ossuaries, six inscribed with epigraphs, including one interpreted as "Yeshua bar Yehosef" ("Jeshua, son of Joseph"), although the inscription is partially illegible, and its translation and interpretation is widely disputed. It is widely believed by scholars that the Jesus in Talpiot (if this is indeed his name) is not Jesus of Nazareth, but a person with the same name, since he appears to have a son named Judas (buried next to him) and the tomb shows signs of belonging to a wealthy Judean family, while Jesus of Nazareth came from a low-class Galilean family.

Roza Bal

The Roza Bal is a shrine located in the Khanyar quarter in downtown area of Srinagar in Kashmir. The word roza means tomb, the word bal mean place. Locals believe a sage is buried here, Yuzasaf (alternatively Yuz Asaf or Youza Asouph), alongside another Muslim holy man, Mir Sayyid Naseeruddin.

The shrine was relatively unknown until the founder of the Ahmadiyya movement, Mirza Ghulam Ahmad, claimed in 1899 that it is actually the tomb of Jesus. This view is maintained by Ahmadis today, though it is rejected by the local Sunni caretakers of the shrine, one of whom said "the theory that Jesus is buried anywhere on the face of the earth is blasphemous to Islam."

Kirisuto no haka

Shingō village in Japan contains another location of what is purported to be the last resting place of Jesus, the so-called "Tomb of Jesus" (Kirisuto no haka), and the residence of Jesus' last descendants, the family of Sajiro Sawaguchi. According to the Sawaguchi family's claims, Jesus Christ did not die on the cross at Golgotha.  Instead his brother, Isukiri, took his place on the cross, while Jesus fled across Siberia to Mutsu Province, in northern Japan.  Once in Japan, he changed his name to Torai Tora Daitenku, became a rice farmer, married a twenty-year old Japanese woman named Miyuko, and raised three daughters near what is now Shingō. While in Japan, it is asserted that he traveled, learned, and eventually died at the age of 106. His body was exposed on a hilltop for four years. According to the customs of the time, Jesus' bones were collected, bundled, and buried in the mound purported to be the grave of Jesus Christ.

See also
 Burial of Jesus
 Unknown years of Jesus

References

External links

List of tomb sites with photographs

 
Jesus and history
Relics associated with Jesus